The Spitter is a stream near Tambach-Dietharz in the Thuringian Forest in Germany. It flows through the Spitter Valley and has the highest waterfall in Thuringia. The course of the Spitter crosses the Rennsteig in the area of the Ebertswiese nature reserve and is the only stream along the route of the Rennsteig.

Spitter Waterfall

The Spitter Waterfall is located below the hillwalking trail of the Rennsteig and tumbles down four cascade steps, through a notch in the floor of an ice-age hollow on the northern side of the Thuringian Forest.

The waterfall is part of the Spitter stream. The Spitter Waterfall itself is in the district of Gotha.

References

Rivers of Thuringia
Waterfalls of Germany
Landforms of Thuringia
Gotha (district)
Thuringian Forest
Cascade waterfalls
Rivers of Germany